Dževad Poturak (born September 20, 1977) is a Bosnian heavyweight kickboxer, fighting out of Jumruk Gym in Sarajevo, Bosnia and Herzegovina. He is the former WAKO Pro World Low-Kick champion and K-1 Fighting Network Prague 2007 tournament champion.

Career
Poturak first came to prominence when he defeated Siniša Puljak to win the WKA European Championship on December 21, 2003. He then made his K-1 debut at K-1 Grand Prix BIH 2004 in June 2004, losing to Josip Bodrozic. He did not return to the promotion until April 2006 when he took part in the eight-man tournament at K-1 Italy Oktagon 2006. He was defeated in the final by Sergei Gur after beating Ricardo van den Bos and Humberto Evora.

The following year, he took part in the Grand Prixs at K-1 European League 2007 Hungary and K-1 Fighting Network Turkey 2007 but was unable to win either. In his last event of the year, on December 15, 2007 at K-1 Fighting Network Prague 2007, he was finally able to win a tournament by defeating Daniel Jerling, Duško Basrak and Roman Kleibl. He returned to defend his crown the next year at K-1 Fighting Network Prague 2008 but was knocked out by Ashwin Balrak in the quarter-finals.

On May 21, 2011, he took part in the four-man tournament at SuperKombat World Grand Prix I in Romania. He lost to Sergei Lascenko at the first stage via knock out due to a knee to the body.

On July 30, 2011, Poturak faced Alain Ngalani for the IKA Super Heavyweight World Championship in Las Vegas, Nevada, US. In the first round, Poturak knocked Ngalani to the canvas and continued to punch him on the back of his head when he was down. Originally, Ngalani was announced as the winner via disqualification. However, the decision was later overturned by the Las Vegas Sports Committee and was ruled a no contest.

He next faced Sebastian Ciobanu at the SuperKombat World Grand Prix 2012 IV on October 20, 2012 in Arad, Romania, with a wild card spot for the SuperKombat Final Elimination up for grabs. He lost via unanimous decision

He lost a split decision to Ibrahim Aarab on November 10, 2012 in Craiova, Romania in a non-tournament bout at the SuperKombat World Grand Prix 2012 Final Elimination.

He rematched Sergei Lascenko in the reserve bout for the K-1 World Grand Prix 2012 Final in Zagreb, Croatia on March 15, 2013 and won via unanimous decision. He was then entered into the semi-finals of the competition against Ismael Londt after Badr Hari withdrew with a broken foot. He retired in round two after having his rib broken from a knee.

He lost to Igor Jurković by unanimous decision at Final Fight Championship 6 in Poreč, Croatia on June 14, 2013. Poturak announced his retirement just four days later, stating that he will have one last fight against Stefan Leko at Final Fight Championships 7 in his home town of Sarajevo on September 6, 2013.

On December 8, 2013 Dževad organised another tournament in his nativ Sarajevo, Bosnia and Herzegovina called No limit K-1 rules, and he announced that this will be his last fight. He fought Mamoudou Keta in an exhibition bout. At the end of first round Dževad took off his gloves and retired from the sport, fight was declared No Contest. After that Dževad Poturak decided to return to rings with No Limit 7 event for WAKO PRO World Title Low Kick +94,00 kg professional fight against world champion French kickboxer Abdarhmane Coulibaly. The event No Limit 7 was realized on 15 August 2014 and he has beaten his opponent by knockout after a rough fight.

Hand injury forced him to cancel fight for the FFC light heavyweight championship against Champion, Pavel Zhuravlev. Fight was expected to be at FFC 27: Night of Champions on December 17, 2016 in Zagreb, Croatia.

Championships and accomplishments

Professional Kickboxing
 K-1
 2007 K-1 Fighting Network Prague Champion
 2007 K-1 European League Hungary Runner-up
 2006 K-1 Italy Oktagon  Runner-up
 WAKO Pro
 2014 WAKO Pro World Low Kick Champion +94.2 kg
 WKA
 2003 WKA European Heavyweight Championship 
 KOK
 2019 KOK European Heavyweight Championship

Kickboxing record 

|-
|
|Loss
| Ștefan Lătescu
|Dynamite Fighting Show 11
|Bucharest, Romania
|Decision (unanimous) 
|align="center"|3
|align="center"|3:00
| 
|-
|
|Win
| Nikola Dimkovski
|KOK Sarajevo
|Bosnia and Herzegovina
|TKO
|align="center"|1
|align="center"|3:00
| 
|-
|
|Win
| Kirill Buller	
|KOK'80 World Series 2019 in Lithuania
|Lithuania
|TKO (injury/corner stoppage)
|align="center"|1
|align="center"|3:00
| 
|-
|
|Win
| Dritan Barjamaj	
|KOK 75 World Series 2019 in Sarajevo
|Bosnia and Herzegovina
|TKO (corner stoppage/low kicks)
|align="center"|2
|align="center"|3:00
|KOK European Heavyweight Title Fight
|-
|
|Loss
| Daniel Ghiță	
|Colosseum Tournament 9
|Cluj Napoca, Romania
|TKO (towel thrown/left low kicks)
|align="center"|1
|align="center"|1:38
| 
|-
|
|Win
| Lukasz Lipniacki	
|16. DSF K1 Challenge
|Zabrze, Poland
|Decision (unanimous)
|align="center"|3
|align="center"|3:00
| 
|-
|
|  Loss
| Alexey Ignashov
|Bellator Kickboxing 9
|Hungary
|Decision (split)
|3
|3:00
| 
|-
|
|  Loss
| Michal Turynski
|DSF Kickboxing 13
|Poland
|Decision 
|3
|3:00
|For WAKO Pro World Low Kick Championship +94.2 kg.
|-
|
|  Loss
| Miran Fabjan
|W5 Legends Collide
|Koper, Slovenia
|Decision (unanimous)
|3
|3:00
| 
|-
|
|  Loss
| Antonios Armenatzoglu
|World Thai Boxing Champions Night II
|Istanbul, Turkey
|Decision (unanimous)
|3
|3:00
| 
|-
|
| Loss
| Mladen Brestovac
|FFC 29
|Ljubljana, Slovenia
|Decision (unanimous)
|3
|3:00
|For The FFC Heavyweight Title.
|-
|
|Loss
| Ibrahim El Bouni
|W5 Grand Prix "Legends in Prague"
|Prague, The Czech Republic
|TKO
|1
|N/A
| 
|-
|
|Loss
| Michał Turyński
|No Limit 8
|Sarajevo, Bosnia and Herzegovina
|Decision (split)
|align="center"|5
|align="center"|3:00
|Lost WAKO Pro World Low Kick Championship +94.2 kg.
|-
|
|Loss
| Patrice Quarteron
|Paris Fight
|Paris, France
|KO (elbows)
|align="center"|1
|align="center"|0:20
|
|-
|
|Loss
| Frédéric Sinistra
|FFC 20: Zagreb
|Zagreb, Croatia
|Decision (unanimous)
|align="center"|3
|align="center"|3:00
|
|-
|
|Loss
| Zabit Samedov	
|Akhmat Fight Show
|Grozny, Chechnya, Russia
|Decision (unanimous)
|align="center"|3
|align="center"|3:00
| 
|-
|
|Win
| Frank Muñoz	
|FFC 7: Sarajevo
|Sarajevo, Bosnia and Herzegovina
|Decision (unanimous)
|align="center"|3
|align="center"|3:00
|Both were deducted 1 point in 2nd round for passivity.Munoz was deducted 1 point in 3rd round for punching after the break.
|-
|
|Win
| Theodosiadis Panagiotis 	
|FFC 16: Vienna
|Vienna, Austria
|Decision (unanimous)
|align="center"|3
|align="center"|3:00
| 
|-
|
|Win
| Abdarhmane Coulibaly
|No Limit 7
|Zenica, Bosnia and Herzegovina
|KO (right overhand)
|align="center"|2
|align="center"|N/A
|Return from retirement.Wins WAKO Pro World Low Kick Championship +94.2 kg.
|-
|
|align="center" style="background: #c5d2ea"|Exh.
| Mamoudou Keta
|No Limit 1
|Sarajevo, Bosnia and Herzegovina
|Exhibition
|align="center"|1
|align="center"|3:00
|Retiring bout.
|-
|
|Loss
| Alexander Chernikov
|Tatneft Arena World Cup 2014 1st selection 1/8 final (+91 kg)
|Kazan, Russia
|Decision (unanimous)
|align="center"|4
|align="center"|3:00
| 
|-
|
|Loss
| Igor Jurković
|FFC06: Jurković vs. Poturak
|Poreč, Croatia
|Decision (unanimous)
|align="center"|3
|align="center"|3:00
| 
|-
|
|Loss
| Ismael Londt
|K-1 World Grand Prix 2012 Final
|Zagreb, Croatia
|TKO (broken rib)
|align="center"|2
|align="center"|1:25
|Semi-finals.
|-
|
|Win
| Sergei Lascenko
|K-1 World Grand Prix 2012 Final
|Zagreb, Croatia
|Decision (unanimous)
|align="center"|3
|align="center"|3:00
|Reserve fight.
|-
|
|Loss
| Ibrahim Aarab
|SuperKombat World Grand Prix 2012 Final Elimination
|Craiova, Romania
|Decision (split)
|align="center"|3
|align="center"|3:00
|Super fight.
|-
|
|Loss
| Sebastian Ciobanu
|SuperKombat World Grand Prix IV 2012
|Arad, Romania
|Decision (unanimous)
|align="center"|3
|align="center"|3:00
|Super fight.
|-
|
|Win
| Tomáš Možný
|Sarajevo Fight Night 3
|Sarajevo, Bosnia and Herzegovina
|Decision (split)
|align="center"|3
|align="center"|3:00
| 
|-
|
|Loss
| Daniel Ghiţă
|Music Hall & BFN Group present: It's Showtime 57 & 58
|Brussels, Belgium
|KO (liver kick)
|align="center"|2
|align="center"|0:32
| 
|-
|
|Loss
| Brian Douwes
|SuperKombat World Grand Prix I 2012
|Podgorica, Montenegro
|TKO (retirement)
|align="center"|3
|align="center"|2:15
|Reserve fight.
|-
|
|Win
| Ricardo Soneca
|Tatneft Cup 2011 Final
|Kazan, Russia
|Decision (unanimous)
|align="center"|3
|align="center"|3:00
| 
|-
|
|align="center" style="background: #c5d2ea"|NC
| Alain Ngalani
|Elite Kickboxing
|Las Vegas, Nevada, USA
|NC
|align="center"|1
|align="center"|2:06
|For IKA Super Heavyweight World Championship.Ngalani could not continue after getting knocked down with an alleged punch to the back of his head.
|-
|
|Loss
| Sergei Lascenko
|SuperKombat World Grand Prix I
|Bucharest, Romania
|KO (knee to the body)
|align="center"|2
|align="center"|2:00
|SuperKombat World Grand Prix I semi-final.
|-
|
|Win
| Ionuţ Iftimoaie
|SuperKombat: The Pilot Show
|Râmnicu Vâlcea, Romania
|Decision (unanimous)
|align="center"|3
|align="center"|3:00
| 
|-
|
|Win
| Wendell Roche
|K-1 Fight Night 2 in Sarajevo
|Sarajevo, Bosnia and Herzegovina
|Decision (unanimous)
|align="center"|3
|align="center"|3:00
| 
|-
|
|Win
| Chalid Arrab
|K-1 World Grand Prix 2010 in Seoul Final 16
|Seoul, South Korea
|TKO (corner stoppage)
|align="center"|3
|align="center"|0:06
| 
|-
|
|Loss
| Rico Verhoeven
|It's Showtime 2010 Amsterdam
|Amsterdam, Netherlands
|Decision (unanimous)
|align="center"|3
|align="center"|3:00
| 
|-
|
|Loss
| Alistair Overeem
|K-1 World Grand Prix 2010 in Yokohama
|Yokohama, Japan
|KO (right knee)
|align="center"|1
|align="center"|2:40
| 
|-
|
|Loss
| Daniel Ghiţă
|It's Showtime 2010 Prague
|Prague, Czech Republic
|Decision (unanimous)
|align="center"|3
|align="center"|3:00
| 
|-
|
|Loss
| Raul Cătinaș
|K-1 ColliZion 2009 Final Elimination
|Arad, Romania
|Decision (unanimous)
|align="center"|3
|align="center"|3:00
| 
|-
|
|Win
| Petr Vondracek
|K-1 ColliZion 2009 Sarajevo
|Sarajevo, Bosnia and Herzegovina
|Decision (unanimous)
|align="center"|3
|align="center"|3:00
| 
|-
|
|Win
| Yuksel Ayaydin
|Local Kombat 33
|Oradea, Romania
|Decision (unanimous)
|align="center"|3
|align="center"|3:00
| 
|-
|
|Loss
| Alexey Ignashov
|K-1 Rules Tournament 2009 in Budapest
|Budapest, Hungary
|Extra round decision (unanimous)
|align="center"|4
|align="center"|3:00
| 
|-
|
|Loss
| Ashwin Balrak
|K-1 Fighting Network Prague 2008
|Prague, Czech Republic
|TKO
|align="center"|2
|align="center"|N/A
|2008 Prague Grand Prix quarter-final.
|-
|
|Win
| Daniel Ghiţă
|Local Kombat 31
|Buzău, Romania
|Decision (unanimous)
|align="center"|3
|align="center"|3:00
| 
|-
|
|Win
| Raul Cătinaș
|K-1 Slovakia 2008
|Bratislava, Slovakia
|Decision (unanimous)
|align="center"|3
|align="center"|3:00
| 
|-
|
|Win
| Eduardo Maiorino
|Planet Battle: Where Champions Collide
|Hong Kong
|KO (right hook)
|align="center"|1
|align="center"|1:09
| 
|-
|
|Win
| Vitor Miranda
|K-1 Fighting Network Austria 2008
|Vienna, Austria
|Decision
|align="center"|3
|align="center"|3:00
| 
|-
|
|Win
| Roman Kleibl
|K-1 Fighting Network Prague 2007
|Prague, Czech Republic
|KO
|align="center"|2
|align="center"|1:10
|2007 Prague Grand Prix final.
|-
|
|Win
| Duško Basrak
|K-1 Fighting Network Prague 2007
|Prague, Czech Republic
|TKO
|align="center"|1
|align="center"|1:27
|2007 Prague Grand Prix semi-final.
|-
|
|Win
| Daniel Jerling
|K-1 Fighting Network Prague 2007
|Prague, Czech Republic
|Decision (majority)
|align="center"|3
|align="center"|3:00
|2007 Prague Grand Prix quarter-final.
|-
|
|Loss
| Vitor Miranda
|K-1 Fighting Network Turkey 2007
|Istanbul, Turkey
|KO (high kick)
|align="center"|3
|align="center"|2:45
|2007 Turkey Grand Prix semi-final.
|-
|
|Win
| Abdulmalik Gadzhiev
|K-1 Fighting Network Turkey 2007
|Istanbul, Turkey
|KO (right hook)
|align="center"|1
|align="center"|2:58
|2007 Turkey Grand Prix quarter-final.
|-
|
|Loss
| Sergei Gur
|Noc Bojovnikov 4
|Bratislava, Slovakia
|Decision
|align="center"|3
|align="center"|3:00
| 
|-
|
|Loss
| Maksim Neledva
|K-1 European League 2007 Hungary
|Budapest, Hungary
|TKO
|align="center"|2
|align="center"|N/A
|2007 Hungary Grand Prix final.
|-
|
|Win
| Gabor Meizster
|K-1 European League 2007 Hungary
|Budapest, Hungary
|KO (right high kick)
|align="center"|3
|align="center"|1:20
|2007 Hungary Grand Prix semi-final.
|-
|
|Win
| Domagoj Ostojić
|K-1 European League 2007 Hungary
|Budapest, Hungary
|Extra round decision
|align="center"|4
|align="center"|3:00
|2007 Hungary Grand Prix quarter-final.
|-
|
|Win
| Jörgen Kruth
|K-1 Fighting Network Prague Round '07
|Prague, Czech Republic
|Decision
|align="center"|3
|align="center"|3:00
| 
|-
|
|Win
| Djamal Kasumov
|K-1 Hungary 2006
|Debrecen, Hungary
|Decision (split)
|align="center"|3
|align="center"|3:00
| 
|-
|
|Loss
| Sergei Gur
|K-1 Italy Oktagon 2006
|Milan, Italy
|Decision
|align="center"|3
|align="center"|3:00
|2006 Italy Grand Prix final.
|-
|
|Win
| Humberto Evora
|K-1 Italy Oktagon 2006
|Milan, Italy
|KO
|align="center"|2
|align="center"|N/A
|2006 Italy Grand Prix semi-final.
|-
|
|Win
| Ricardo van den Bos
|K-1 Italy Oktagon 2006
|Milan, Italy
|Decision (unanimous)
|align="center"|3
|align="center"|3:00
|2006 Italy Grand Prix quarter-final.
|-
|
|Win
| Jörgen Kruth
|It's Showtime 75MAX Trophy, 1st Round - Prague
|Prague, Czech Republic
|Decision
|align="center"|3
|align="center"|3:00
| 
|-
|
|Loss
| Nikola Dimkovski
|International Profi Tournament
|N/A
|Decision
|align="center"|3
|align="center"|3:00
|
|-
|
|Loss
| Johnny Delgado
|Gala Valkenswaard-Siam Gym
|Valkenswaard, Netherlands
|Decision
|align="center"|3
|align="center"|3:00
| 
|-
|
|Win
| Melvin Manhoef
|Gala Gym Alkmaar
|Alkmaar, Netherlands
|KO (punches)
|align="center"|3
|align="center"|2:55
| 
|-
|
|Win
| Gordan Jukic
|Fight Night
|Sarajevo, Bosnia and Herzegovina
|Decision (unanimous)
|align="center"|5
|align="center"|3:00
| 
|-
|
|Loss
| Josip Bodrozic
|K-1 Grand Prix BIH 2004
|Široki Brijeg, Bosnia and Herzegovina
|Decision (unanimous)
|align="center"|3
|align="center"|3:00
|2004 Bosnia Grand Prix quarter-final.
|-
|
|Win
| Robert Gregor
|Unknown
|Tuzla, Bosnia and Herzegovina
|KO (right hook)
|align="center"|5
|align="center"|0:21
| 
|-
|
|Win
| Sinisa Puljak
|Unknown
|Bosnia and Herzegovina
|Decision (unanimous)
|align="center"|5
|align="center"|3:00
|Wins WKA European Heavyweight Championship.
|-
|
|Win
| Milan Rabrenovic
|K-1 Night of Champions
|Bosnia and Herzegovina
|TKO (referee stoppage)
|align="center"|3
|align="center"|1:41
| 
|-
|
|Loss
| Josip Bodrozic
|King of Colosseum K-1 GP BIH 2003
|Novi Travnik, Bosnia and Herzegovina
|N/A
|align="center"|N/A
|align="center"|N/A
|2003 Bosnia Grand Prix semi-final.
|-
|
|Win
| Ergin Solmaz
|King of Colosseum K-1 GP BIH 2003
|Novi Travnik, Bosnia and Herzegovina
|Decision (unanimous)
|align="center"|3
|align="center"|3:00
|2003 Bosnia Grand Prix quarter-final.
|-
|
|Loss
| Tihamer Brunner
|K-1 FIGHT Makarska 2003
|Makarska, Croatia
|Decision (unanimous)
|align="center"|3
|align="center"|3:00
| 
|-
|
|Win
| Nikola Dimkovski
|Night of Warriors
|Bosnia and Herzegovina
|Decision (unanimous)
|align="center"|5
|align="center"|3:00
| 
|-
|-
| colspan=9 | Legend:

See also
 List of male kickboxers
 List of K-1 Events

References

1977 births
Living people
Bosnia and Herzegovina male kickboxers
Heavyweight kickboxers
Bosnia and Herzegovina Muay Thai practitioners
Bosnia and Herzegovina police officers
Sportspeople from Sarajevo
SUPERKOMBAT kickboxers
King of Kings champions